Oatlands Historic House and Gardens (formerly Oatlands Plantation) is an estate located in Leesburg, Virginia.  Oatlands is operated by the National Trust for Historic Preservation and is listed on the National Register of Historic Places as a National Historic Landmark. The Oatlands property is composed of the main mansion and 415 acres (168.0 ha) of farmland and gardens. The house is judged one of the finest Federal period country estate houses in the nation.

On the property, in addition to the Mansion, are a number of outbuildings, including the Carriage House, Bachelor's Cottage, several barns and farm buildings, and a greenhouse, built in 1810, said to be the oldest standing greenhouse in the South.

History

Oatlands was established by George Carter, a great-grandson of Robert "King" Carter, in 1798 on 3,408 acres (1,980 ha) of farmland. It started as a wheat farm, but expanded to include other grains, sheep, a gristmill and a saw mill, and a vineyard. In 1804, Carter began construction of a Federal mansion, which he expanded in the 1820s and 1830s. A terraced garden and numerous outbuildings were added during this time.

Carter's plantation and business ventures were built with, and by, enslaved laborers. When Carter took ownership of the land and the people who worked there, there were 17 enslaved labors on the land. Through both purchase of more enslaved people, and the system of chattel slavery (their children were also enslaved), the Carter Plantation claimed 133 people as property at the time of the 1860 census. Their work included planting and harvesting the fields; caring for farm animals; domestic labor such as cooking, cleaning, caring for children, and sewing; and probably trades such as blacksmithing and milling.

George Carter's widow, Elizabeth Grayson Lewis Carter, inherited the property after her husband's death in 1846. In 1861, fearing that a battle between Union and Confederate forces was imminent nearby, Elizabeth Carter fled to another of her properties, Bellefield. The Carters' eldest son, George Carter II, reopened the mansion with his wife, Katherine Powell Carter, in 1863 and inherited the property when his mother died in 1887.

In 1897 the Carter family sold the mansion with 60 acres (24.3 ha) for $10,000 to Stilson Hutchins, founder of The Washington Post newspaper, who never lived on the property.

Hutchins sold Oatlands in 1903 to William Corcoran Eustis and Edith Livingston Morton Eustis. Mrs. Eustis restored the gardens from neglect, adding boxwood-lined parterres to the terraces, statuary, a rose garden, a bowling green, and a reflecting pool. Today her plantings include mature specimens of Buxus sempervirens `Arborescens’ and `Suffruticosa’, Larix decidua, and Quercus robur. The house was also upgraded with modern amenities including indoor plumbing, heating and gas lighting, along with pine floors placed over the original Carter flooring, an elevator, and a custom first floor bathroom for childhood friend, Franklin D. Roosevelt.

Due to their prominent political stance in Washington, D.C., the Eustises had many famous friends including General George C. Marshall, Henry Cabot Lodge, President Harry S. Truman and Franklin and Eleanor Roosevelt.

After Mrs. Eustis' death in 1964, her daughters, Margaret and Anne, donated the mansion, furnishings, and estate grounds to Margaret's husband, David E. Finley, founder of the National Trust for Historic Preservation.

It was declared a National Historic Landmark in 1971. In 1974 a series of scenic easements around the National Historic Landmark area were designated the Oatlands Historic District on the National Register of Historic Places. The district includes Oatland Mills, the Mountain Gap School, and the Church of Our Savior.

Visiting
Oatlands is open for visitation March 30 through December 30 seven days a week of each year. An admission fee is charged.

See also 
 List of botanical gardens in the United States
 List of National Historic Landmarks in Virginia
 National Register of Historic Places listings in Loudoun County, Virginia

References

External links

Oatlands at National Trust for Historic Preservation

Houses on the National Register of Historic Places in Virginia
Carter family residences
Historic house museums in Virginia
National Historic Landmarks in Virginia
Museums in Loudoun County, Virginia
Federal architecture in Virginia
Plantations in Virginia
Houses in Loudoun County, Virginia
Journey Through Hallowed Ground National Heritage Area
Historic American Buildings Survey in Virginia
National Register of Historic Places in Loudoun County, Virginia
National Trust for Historic Preservation
Corcoran family
Leesburg, Virginia